The 1928 Loyola Lions football team was an American football team that represented Loyola College of Los Angeles (now known as Loyola Marymount University) as an independent during the 1928 college football season. The Lions compiled a 5–3 record and outscored their opponents by a total of 147 to 50.

In February 1928, Mike Pecarovich was hired to coach the team. He had previously played football at Gonzaga under Gus Dorais and later served as an assistant coach under Dorais. Before the season began, Pecarovich trained the team in the "Notre Dame shift" along with several of his own variations.

Schedule

References

Loyola
Loyola Lions football seasons
Loyola Lions football